All the Way is a 2016 American biographical television drama film based on events during the presidency of Lyndon B. Johnson. Directed by Jay Roach and adapted by Robert Schenkkan from his 2012 play All the Way, the film stars Bryan Cranston, who reprises his role as Johnson from the play's 2014 Broadway production, opposite Melissa Leo as First Lady Lady Bird Johnson; Anthony Mackie as Civil Rights Movement leader Martin Luther King Jr.; and Frank Langella as U.S. Senator Richard Russell Jr. from Georgia.

The film was broadcast on HBO on Saturday, May 21, 2016. The film was well received by critics, with Cranston's portrayal of Johnson garnering praise. It has been nominated for a Television Critics Association Award for Outstanding Achievement in Movies, Miniseries and Specials, with Cranston also nominated for Individual Achievement in Drama for his work on the film. It was nominated for eight Primetime Emmy Awards, including Outstanding Television Movie as well as acting nominations for Cranston and Leo.

Plot
Lyndon Baines Johnson becomes President of the United States after the John F. Kennedy assassination, assisted and advised by his wife Lady Bird. Johnson enters the White House but soon must work on the passage of the Civil Rights Act. Martin Luther King Jr. pressures Johnson to pass the bill without amendments that would defang it; Southern Democrats such as Richard Russell Jr. of Georgia oppose the bill so much that they may abandon the Democratic Party if the bill passes, and Republicans and Democrats on the fence offer amendments opposed by the liberals and the Civil Rights activists.  At the same time, Johnson wants to declare a War on Poverty.  The Gulf of Tonkin incident causes Johnson to ask Congress for a resolution endorsing a reprisal against North Vietnam, wary of being outflanked on the issue by the Republicans.

After successful passage of the Civil Rights Act over a filibuster, Johnson contends for election against Barry Goldwater in the 1964 presidential election.  This is complicated by the Freedom Summer movement and pulls between the northern liberal wing and Southern Dixiecrat wing of the Democratic Party.  Johnson assigns J. Edgar Hoover to investigate the murders of Chaney, Goodman, and Schwerner in Mississippi.  The state of Mississippi also sends two delegations to the Democratic National Convention in Atlantic City: the "normal" delegation from the Dixiecrat wing, which threatened to walk out on Johnson, and the Mississippi Freedom Democratic Party, a renegade wing supported by the Civil Rights Movement, but vehemently opposed by other Southerners.  Johnson, in a bid to save the South, offers the MFDP a compromise that satisfies neither side; the Mississippi delegation walks out, and the MFDP is unhappy with the two at-large delegates offered to them.

Johnson hits Goldwater hard in the election, portraying him as a dangerous fanatic who will destroy the world, but is worried.  Johnson's aide and friend Walter Jenkins is arrested for "disorderly conduct" after he is found in a tryst with another man in a public restroom; Johnson has an uncomfortable conversation with Hoover on how this fact slipped by security screening.  Martin Luther King wins the Nobel Peace Prize; Hoover, still distrusting King, sends him an insulting, anonymous letter demanding King commit suicide, which is ignored.  Johnson wins the election conclusively, but the Democratic Party loses the states of the Deep South.

Hints of the Vietnam War, the Great Society programs against poverty, the Voting Rights Act of 1965, and the continuing loss of the South to the Republicans are given at the end.

Cast

 Bryan Cranston as President Lyndon B. Johnson
 Anthony Mackie as Martin Luther King Jr.
 Melissa Leo as First Lady Lady Bird Johnson
 Frank Langella as Senator Richard B. Russell Jr.
 Bradley Whitford as Senator Hubert H. Humphrey Jr.
 Stephen Root as FBI Director J. Edgar Hoover
 Marque Richardson as Bob Moses
 Aisha Hinds as Fannie Lou Hamer
 Todd Weeks as Walter Jenkins
 Regi Davis as Aaron Henry
 Mo McRae as Stokely Carmichael
 Spencer Garrett as Walter Reuther
 Ken Jenkins as Rep. Howard W. "Judge" Smith
 Jeff Doucette as Senator James Eastland
 Randy Oglesby as Senator J. Strom Thurmond
 Samantha Bogach as Luci Johnson
 Tim True as Deke Deloach
 Bruce Nozick as Stanley Levison
 Ned Van Zandt as Senator J. William Fulbright
 Joe O'Connor as Senator Robert Byrd
 Hal Landon Jr. as Speaker John McCormack
 Dan Desmond as Rep. Bill McCulloch
 Stoney Westmoreland as Rep. James C. Corman
 Ray Wise as Senator Everett M. Dirksen
 Eric Pumphrey as Dave Dennis
 Dohn Norwood as Ralph Abernathy
 Joe Morton as Roy Wilkins
 Toby Huss as Governor Paul B. Johnson Jr. 
 Matthew Glave as Governor Carl Sanders
 Bo Foxworth as Secretary of Defense Robert McNamara

Production

On July 16, 2014, it was announced that HBO Films had acquired the rights to the play All the Way with Robert Schenkkan writing the adaptation and Bryan Cranston reprising his role as Lyndon B. Johnson. Schenkkan and producer Steven Spielberg agreed that the adaptation would differ significantly from the play. Schenkkan says, "When Steven, Bryan Cranston and I brought this to HBO, what I said at the time was, 'Look, I have no interest in just shooting the play. What I want to do is a complete cinematic reimagining of this story.' Everybody was on board for that. It's obviously recognizably the same story with many – but not all – of the same characters. I took a really hard look at how I could best tell this story on screen now that I had all the things that cinema brings that I did not have in my toolkit when I was working on stage."

On March 7, 2015, it was announced that Jay Roach would direct the film. On June 30, 2015, Anthony Mackie was cast as Martin Luther King Jr. On July 2, 2015, Melissa Leo was cast as Lady Bird Johnson. On July 8, 2015, Stephen Root and Marque Richardson were cast as J. Edgar Hoover and Bob Moses, respectively. On July 23, 2015, Bradley Whitford was cast as Hubert Humphrey. On July 23, 2015, Aisha Hinds, Spencer Garrett, Todd Weeks, and Mo McRae were cast as Fannie Lou Hamer, Walter Reuther, Walter Jenkins, and Stokely Carmichael, respectively. On July 28, 2015, Frank Langella was cast as Richard Russell Jr. On September 18, 2015, Bruce Nozick was cast as Stanley Levison. On September 29, 2015, Ned Van Zandt was cast as J. William Fulbright.

Filming began on August 13, 2015, and took place in Los Angeles.

Reception
All the Way received positive reviews from critics. The review aggregator website Rotten Tomatoes gave the film an approval rating of 87%, based on 46 reviews, with an average rating of 7.9/10. The site's critical consensus reads, "Anchored by Bryan Cranston's phenomenal performance as LBJ, All the Way is an engrossing portrayal of a complicated man during a pivotal moment in US history." On Metacritic the film has a score of 78 out of 100, based on 27 critics, indicating "generally favorable reviews".

All the Way drew approximately 1.11 million total viewers and a 0.2 rating among adults 18–49, making it the second most watched (at the time it aired) HBO original movie behind 2015's Bessie.

Awards and nominations

See also
 1956 Sugar Bowl
 civil rights movement
 Civil rights movement in popular culture

References

External links
 

2016 films
2016 television films
2016 biographical drama films
2010s historical drama films
2010s political drama films
American films based on plays
American biographical drama films
American political drama films
Biographical television films
Civil rights movement in film
Civil rights movement in television
Cultural depictions of J. Edgar Hoover
Drama films based on actual events
American drama television films
Films about Lyndon B. Johnson
Films about Martin Luther King Jr.
Films about presidents of the United States
Films directed by Jay Roach
Films scored by James Newton Howard
Films set in the 1960s
Films set in Washington, D.C.
Films shot in Los Angeles
HBO Films films
Political films based on actual events
Vietnam War films
2010s English-language films
2010s American films